James Michael "Jim" Poterba, FBA (born July 13, 1958) is an American economist, Mitsui Professor of Economics at the Massachusetts Institute of Technology, and current NBER president and chief executive officer.

Early years
Poterba was born in New York City. He completed his A.B., summa cum laude, in 1980 from Harvard University and completed his PhD in 1983 from Nuffield College, Oxford. He was a Marshall Scholar.

Academic career
Poterba started his career as an instructor in Economics at the Massachusetts Institute of Technology. He became Professor of Economics at MIT in 1988. Today, he is the Mitsui Professor of Economics. He became the president of the National Bureau of Economic Research on 1 July 2008.

Research
Poterba is known for his research on how taxation affects the economic decisions of households and firms. His research has emphasized the effect of taxation on the financial behavior of households, particularly their saving and portfolio decisions. He is also interested in the analysis of tax-deferred retirement saving programs such as 401(k) plans and in the role of annuities in financing retirement consumption.

He has also been Director of the NBER Public Economics Research Program since 1991. He has served as a member of the President's Advisory Panel on Federal Tax Reform and edited the Journal of Public Economics, the leading international journal for research on taxation and government spending, between 1997 and 2006. He has edited several economics journals.

Honours
He was elected a Fellow of the American Academy of Arts and Sciences in 1996. In 1999 Poterba was awarded the NAS Award for Scientific Reviewing from the National Academy of Sciences.

In July 2017, Poterba was elected a Corresponding Fellow of the British Academy (FBA), the United Kingdom's national academy for the humanities and social sciences.

Personal life
Poterba is married to economist Nancy Rose.

References

External links
Personal website
Biography of James M. Poterba
CV of James M. Poterba
Profile of James M. Poterba
NBER Working Papers by James M. Poterba

1958 births
Alumni of Nuffield College, Oxford
Economists from New York (state)
Fellows of the American Academy of Arts and Sciences
Harvard University alumni
Living people
MIT School of Humanities, Arts, and Social Sciences faculty
Marshall Scholars
Scientists from New York City
Fellows of the Econometric Society
Corresponding Fellows of the British Academy
American chief executives
National Bureau of Economic Research
21st-century American economists